Cato is a village in Cayuga County, New York, United States. The population was 532 at the 2010 census. The name was assigned by the surveyors of the Military Tract, and is one of many towns and villages bearing classical place names. The village of Cato is half within the town of Cato and half within the town of Ira. It is west of Syracuse.

History 
The village was part of the Central New York Military Tract, land set aside in 1782 for veterans of the American Revolution. Prior native occupants were compelled to live on reservations established at that time. The first permanent settler arrived around 1805, and the new community was called "Jakway's Corners".

Railroad service came to the village in 1869, aiding its prosperity, but rail service ended in 1953.

Cato is home to the 1993 Section 3 Class D state football champions. Modern Cato is partly a bedroom community, with many residents commuting to surrounding cities.

Geography

The village is located in a drumlin field.

Parker Pond, formerly known as "Forest Lake", is a small lake at the southeast edge of the village. Muskrat Creek drains from the lake and flows southward to the Seneca River (and Erie Canal).

The village is at the junction of NY-34 and NY-370. Locating places within the village is extremely simple, since virtually all locations which may be visited by a non-resident are located on these two highways.

Water tower
The Cato water tower stands  over the village of Cato, to the northeast of the village center. The light blue structure had been a landmark for 75 years or more but was to be torn down as of June 2012. The new water tower was to be dark blue on top and still say "Cato" on both sides. It will also be bigger, holding 25,000 extra gallons of water, in anticipation of future town growth.

Demographics

As of the census of 2000, there were 601 people, 238 households, and 154 families residing in the village.  The population density was 608.2 people per square mile (234.4/km2).  There were 253 housing units at an average density of 256.0 per square mile (98.7/km2).  The racial makeup of the village was 97.50% White, 0.33% Black or African American, 0.50% Native American, 0.33% from other races, and 1.33% from two or more races. Hispanic or Latino of any race were 0.50% of the population.

There were 238 households, out of which 35.3% had children under the age of 18 living with them, 51.3% were married couples living together, 11.3% had a female householder with no husband present, and 34.9% were non-families. 31.5% of all households were made up of individuals, and 19.7% had someone living alone who was 65 years of age or older.  The average household size was 2.53 and the average family size was 3.15.

In the village, the population was spread out, with 29.5% under the age of 18, 6.3% from 18 to 24, 27.8% from 25 to 44, 19.3% from 45 to 64, and 17.1% who were 65 years of age or older.  The median age was 38 years. For every 100 females, there were 87.8 males.  For every 100 females age 18 and over, there were 80.4 males.

The median income for a household in the village was $35,938, and the median income for a family was $49,219. Males had a median income of $37,303 versus $26,250 for females. The per capita income for the village was $17,511.  About 2.9% of families and 6.9% of the population were below the poverty line, including 5.5% of those under age 18 and 21.0% of those age 65 or over.

References

External links
 Village of Cato official website

Villages in New York (state)
Populated places established in 1805
Villages in Cayuga County, New York
1805 establishments in New York (state)